Miklós Moldován (born 3 October 1954) is a Hungarian former professional footballer who played as a midfielder, later became a football coach. He was a member of the Hungary national team.

Club career 
With FC Tatabánya Moldován finished second in Nemzeti Bajnokság I in the 1987–88 season and third in the 1986–87 season.

International career 
In 1982 Moldován played three times for the Hungary national team.

Coaching career 
From 1993 Moldován was player-coach of Kemecse.

References

External links
 

1954 births
Living people
Hungarian footballers
Association football midfielders
Hungary international footballers
Nemzeti Bajnokság I players
Nemzeti Bajnokság II players
FC Tatabánya players
Debreceni VSC players
Szolnoki MÁV FC footballers